Marshall Islands competed at the 2014 Summer Youth Olympics, in Nanjing, China from 16 August to 28 August 2014.

Athletics

Marshall Islands qualified one athlete.

Qualification Legend: Q=Final A (medal); qB=Final B (non-medal); qC=Final C (non-medal); qD=Final D (non-medal); qE=Final E (non-medal)

Girls
Track & road events

Swimming

Marshall Islands qualified one swimmer.

Boys

Wrestling

Marshall Islands qualified two athletes based on its performance at the 2014 Oceania Cadet Championships.

Boys

Girls

References

2014 in Marshallese sports
Nations at the 2014 Summer Youth Olympics
Marshall Islands at the Youth Olympics